Sabinah Thom (born 3 March 1996) is a Malawian footballer who plays as a forward for DD Sunshine and the Malawi women's national team.

Club career
Thom has played for DD Sunshine in Malawi.

International career
Thom capped for Malawi at senior level during two COSAFA Women's Championship editions (2020 and 2021).

References

External links

1996 births
Living people
People from Lilongwe
Malawian women's footballers
Women's association football forwards
Malawi women's international footballers